A physic garden is a type of herb garden with medicinal plants. Botanical gardens developed from them.

History
Modern botanical gardens were preceded by medieval physic gardens, often monastic gardens, that existed by 800 at least. Pope Nicholas V set aside part of the Vatican grounds in 1447 for a garden of medicinal plants that were used to promote the teaching of botany, and this was a forerunner to the academic botanical gardens at Padua and Pisa established in the 1540s. Certainly the founding of many early botanic gardens was instigated by members of the medical profession.

The naturalist William Turner established physic gardens at Cologne, Wells, and Kew; he also wrote to Lord Burleigh recommending that a physic garden be established at Cambridge University with himself at its head. The 1597 Herball, or Generall Historie of Plantes by herbalist John Gerard was said to be the catalogue raisonné of physic gardens, both public and private, which were instituted throughout Europe. It listed 1,030 plants found in his physic garden at Holborn, and was the first such catalogue printed.

The garden in Oxford, founded by Henry Danvers, 1st Earl of Danby, with Jacob Bobart the Elder as Superintendent, dates to 1632. Begun in Westminster and later moved to Chelsea, the Apothecaries founded the Chelsea Physic Garden in 1673, of which Philip Miller, author of The Gardeners Dictionary, was the most notable Director. By 1676, the position of "Keeper of the Physic Garden" was held by the Professor of Botany at the University of Edinburgh.

Some of the earliest physic gardens included:
 1334, Venice; and at Salerno, founded by Matthaeus Silvaticus
 1544, Pisa, begun by Cosimo de' Medici, with Luca Ghini and Andrea Cesalpino for its first two directors
 1545, Padua
 1547, Bologna, founded by Ghini
 1560, Zurich, founded by Conrad Gessner 
 1570, Paris
 1577, Leyden, under direction of Carolus Clusius
 1580, Leipzig
 1593, Montpelier, by Henry IV

See also

 List of garden types
 Cowbridge Physic Garden, Vale of Glamorgan, Wales
 Edinburgh Physic Garden (or Physical Garden), now the Royal Botanic Garden Edinburgh, Scotland
 Provand's Lordship - the physic garden in Glasgow.

References

Herb gardens
Types of garden
History of pharmacy